Azzedine Mihoubi (born January 1, 1959) is an Algerian political candidate and ex journalist, poet, novelist. He served as the Algerian Minister of Culture.

Early life
Azzedine Mihoubi was born on January 1, 1959, in Khadra, Algeria. He graduated from the École nationale d'administration d'Alger in 1984.

Career
Mihoubi started his career as a journalist in 1986. He was the head of information for Algerian Television from 1996 to 1997. He served as the chief executive of the Algerian Radio from 2006 to 2008, and the National Library of Algeria from 2010 to 2013.

Mihoubi served as a member of the People's National Assembly from 1997 to 2002.

Mihoubi is the author of ten poetry collections and four novels. He is the recipient of several literary prizes for his poetry.

References

Living people
1959 births
People from Mostaganem Province
Algerian journalists
Algerian male poets
20th-century Algerian poets
21st-century Algerian poets
Algerian novelists
Algerian politicians
Culture ministers of Algeria
20th-century male writers
21st-century male writers